Waltersville is an unincorporated community in Warren County, Mississippi, United States.

References

Unincorporated communities in Mississippi
Unincorporated communities in Warren County, Mississippi